Dixeth Palmer (born 26 January 1968) is a Jamaican cricketer. He played in five first-class and three List A matches for the Jamaican cricket team from 1990 to 1995.

See also
 List of Jamaican representative cricketers

References

External links
 

1968 births
Living people
Jamaican cricketers
Jamaica cricketers
People from Saint Elizabeth Parish